ExpanDrive is a network filesystem client for MacOS, Microsoft Windows and Linux that facilitates mapping of local volume to many different types of cloud storage. When a server is mounted with ExpanDrive any program can read, write, and manage remote files (that is, files that only exist on the server) as if they were stored locally. This is different from most File Transfer Clients because it is integrated into all applications on the operating system. It also does not require a file to be downloaded to access portions of the content. ExpanDrive is commercial software, at a cost of $49.95 per license.  A 7-day, unrestricted demo is available for evaluation.

ExpanDrive uses a custom FUSE implementation as its file system implementation layer on the Mac and Windows and system-packaged FUSE on Linux.

History
SftpDrive was the original version of ExpanDrive for Microsoft Windows. It was commercial software with a 6-week trial.

ExpanDrive 2 was released on June 21, 2011 adding support for plain FTP, Amazon S3 and a new ExpanDrive service named Strongspace Online Storage. ExpanDrive2 included a rewritten SFTP engine which laid the groundwork for a unified Mac and Windows code base.

Version 2.4, released in January 2013 was the first version to be released simultaneously for Windows and Mac.

ExpanDrive 3 was released on May 14, 2013 with a new user-interface and support for more drive types such as Dropbox, OpenStack, Rackspace and WebDAV.

ExpanDrive 4 was released on June 12, 2014 with dramatically faster access. ExpanDrive 4 also added support for Microsoft OneDrive, Copy.com, HP Helion Cloud, Owncloud and hubiC.

ExpanDrive 5 was released on June 15, 2015 with a near-total rewrite of its core functionality.

ExpanDrive 6 was released on July 5, 2017, followed by a redesign to version 6.1 on September 25, 2017. The most recent version v6.3 was released on November 2nd, 2018.  

ExpanDrive 7 was released on May 8, 2019, which added support for Linux, A cloud storage browser and transfer application, multi-user file locking, search and version management.  

New features include improved performance and file versioning. An increased list of supported storage and cloud storage providers have been introduced since version 5, including Dropbox, Google Drive, Google Team Drives, Amazon Drive, Box, OneDrive, OneDrive for Business, Sharepoint, Openstack Swift, BackBlaze B2, Amazon S3 as well as the original SFTP, FTP or WebDAV server and SMB/Windows File Sharing.

See also
Comparison of FTP client software
SSH file transfer protocol (SFTP)
Secure Shell (SSH)
SSHFS

References

External links

Review of ExpanDrive at Macworld (November 2008)

SSH File Transfer Protocol clients